B. maritimus may refer to:

 Bolboschoenus maritimus, a bulrush species
 Bromus maritimus, the seaside brome, a plant species

See also
 Maritimus (disambiguation)